Washington has a number of professional and semi-professional sports teams in various sports and leagues.

Major league teams

Other notable sports teams

References

Washington

Professional teams